Nogometni klub Limbuš-Pekre is a Slovenian football club based in Limbuš which plays in the 1. MNZ Maribor League, the fourth highest league in Slovenia. The club was founded in 1973 and is competing under the name Marles hiše due to sponsorship reasons.

Honours
Slovenian Fifth Division
 Winners: 2009–10

Slovenian Sixth Division
 Winners: 2005–06

References

External links
Official website
Weltfussballarchiv profile

Association football clubs established in 1973
Football clubs in Slovenia
1973 establishments in Slovenia